Edgar Whittaker was an English professional footballer who played as a goalkeeper. He made one appearance for Burnley in the Football League Second Division.

References

English footballers
Association football goalkeepers
Burnley F.C. players
English Football League players
Year of death unknown
19th-century births